Deng Wanxing (born 30 January 1987), professionally known as Ivy or Ai Fei, is a Chinese singer, rapper, dancer, actress and television personality. She was born and raised in the Guangxi city of Nanning and received national recognition after finishing third on the first season of Chinese Idol.
She also acted in a film “Step Up Year Of The Dance” (Step Up spin off movie) as Tina

Early life
Deng Wanxing was born to a working class single mother in Nanning, Guangxi and is from the Hui ethnic group. She graduated from the Guangxi Arts Institute after enrolling in 2003.

Career

2006–2012: Career beginnings
Ivy frequently performed in bars for work, citing this as useful experience for the development of her live skills. She frequently performed with Jike Junyi, who came third in season one of The Voice of China.

2013: Chinese Idol and rise to fame
Ivy shot to fame after auditioning for Chinese Idol in 2012, auditioning with Beyoncé's "Single Ladies (Put a Ring on It)". Her performance of "Love On Top" was met with widespread acclaim in China, with her all-round abilities as a performer being praised. Despite being a favourite to win the competition, Ivy finished in third place. Following her elimination, she participated in the Chinese Idol Tour of China and signed to the Shengqiang International record label.

2014–2016: Crazy In Love, Heroes of the Remix and Mask Singer
Releasing her first extended play Crazy In Love on April 2, 2014, Ivy experimented in several sounds on her début release, including electronic rock, hip hop and pop. To celebrate the release of her EP, she held a release party at the Space One nightclub in Beijing, which saw her give her a critically praised performance of the EP.

In 2015, English musician Tricky released an alternate version of her single "Shaliaba", entitled "Beijing to Berlin". It received acclaim from The Guardian and acted as the lead single to his album Skilled Mechanics.

In 2016, she appeared as a contestant on Heroes of Remix in a duo with Chinese singer Dany Lee. The duo reached the grand final however lost out on winning to Wowkie Zhang. She then went onto appear as a judge on Mask Singer from weeks one to four.

2017-present: I. Feminism, collaborations and acting
Ivy's second extended play, I. Feminism was released with Yuehua Entertainment and saw her career brought to new highs as she reached number one on the Billboard China V Chart. Preceded by the single "Li Sao", I. Feminism was the only album by a Mainland China female artist to reach number one that year. It was also the tenth best selling album of 2017 in China, spending 24 weeks on the V Chart. "Li Sao" débuted and peaked at #8 on the YinYueTai V Chart, while "Bad Girls Need Love too" peaked at #9.

In 2018, Ivy featured on two tracks by Korean DJ TPA, "China Trap House" with Hong Kong rapper Al Rocco, and "Combo" with Rocco and Korean artist Seungri. She also co-starred in the Chinese drama My Idol as the character Kim. Ivy further released her new single "Barbies Know Know" with Dany Lee. This marked her third collaboration single with Dany, having previously worked with her on the I. Feminism extended play.

Discography

Extended plays

Singles

References 

1987 births
Living people
People from Nanning
Singers from Guangxi
Hui singers
21st-century Chinese women singers